Parliamentary elections were held in Chad on 21 April 2002. The result was a victory for the ruling Patriotic Salvation Movement (MPS), which won 113 of the 155 seats in the National Assembly.

Background
The elections had been due in April or May 2001, but were postponed by a year to allow the Independent National Electoral Commission to organise the elections properly.

Campaign
Prior to the elections the MPS formed an electoral alliance with the opposition Rally for Democracy and Progress (RDP), weakening the opposition already divided by a boycott by the Party for Liberty and Development (PLD) and the Union for Democracy and Republic (UDR). The PLD and the UDR claimed that the authorities did not provide sufficient guarantees that the elections would be free and fair. However, almost 40 parties did contest the elections, putting forward a total of 427 candidates.

The MPS ran unopposed in 45 constituencies, whilst parties allied with the MPS were unopposed in a further 20 seats.

Results
Voter turnout was moderately high, except in the capital N'Djamena where only 21.8% of the registered voters cast a vote.

Aftermath
Following the election, the National Assembly held its first session on 10 June, electing Nassour Guelendouksia Ouaido of the MPS as President of the National Assembly.

References

Elections in Chad
Chad
2002 in Chad
April 2002 events in Africa
Election and referendum articles with incomplete results